Ernst Hiesmayr (11 July 1920 in Innsbruck – 6 August 2006 in Bregenz) was an Austrian architect, artist and former rector of the Technical University Vienna.

Life 
As a student in his high school years Ernst Hiesmayr already worked on construction sites, where he appropriated his material, construction and practical orientation. During the Second World War, he worked at the labor service and as an officer in the German Wehrmacht. Between 1945 and 1948 Hiesmayr studied architecture at the Graz University of Technology in the class of Friedrich Zotter.

After his studies Hiesmayr worked as a freelance architect in Tyrol, Vorarlberg and Vienna. In 1967 Hiesmayr received his doctorate at the Technical University in Vienna. In 1968 he was appointed full professor in the area of the Institute of Building Construction. In 1973 he became Dean of the Faculty of Civil Engineering and Architecture. From 1975 to 1977 he was Rector of the University of Technology Vienna. In 1988 Hiesmayr was honored with Honorary Senator dignity. He was from 1994 to 2006 member of the Academy of Arts Berlin.

Ernst Hiesmayr was married to Isolde Moosbrugger. He was painted by Maria Lassnig and drawn by Matthias Laurenz Gräff.

Work (selection) 

 1951 – Trade chamber Vorarlberg
 1959 – Hotel Clima in Wien and Innsbruck
 1963 bis 1965 – Villenhotel Bockkeller, Vienna
 1967 – WIFI Dornbirn
 1968 bis 1984 – Juridicum der Universität in Wien
 1971 – Office block Honeywell, Vienna
 1985 – Girozentrale-modification, Vienna

Publications (selection) 
 1991 – "Einfache Häuser“
 1991 – "Das Karge als Inspiration“
 1996 – "Juridicum“
 1999 – "Analytische Bausteine“

Awards (selection) 
 1975: Preis der Stadt Wien für Architektur
 1978: Grand Decoration of Honour for Services to the Republic of Austria in Gold
 1980: European Steel prize
 1988: University of Vienna, Senator by honor
 1999: University of Music and Performing Arts Vienna, Gold medal
 2000: Johann Joseph Ritter von Prechtl-Medaille, TU Wien

Links 
 Website about Ernst Hiesmayr
 
 
 Biography of Ernst Hiesmayr (Academy of Arts Berlin)

References 

1920 births
2006 deaths
Austrian architects
Austrian artists
20th-century Austrian architects
Academic staff of TU Wien